Princess Märtha Louise of Norway (born 22 September 1971) is a member of the Norwegian royal family, a businesswoman and a self-described clairvoyant.

The only daughter of King Harald V and Queen Sonja, she is fourth in the line of succession to the Norwegian throne, after her younger brother Haakon, and his children, but is not a member of the royal house. Like her aunts Ragnhild and Astrid, she had no inheritance rights to the Norwegian throne at the time of her birth due to Norway's agnatic primogeniture succession. This only changed in 1990, when the Norwegian parliament adopted male-preference primogeniture succession for those born before 1990, which made her third in line at the time, after her younger brother.

She is active as a private businesswoman and alternative therapist, and does not carry out official engagements on behalf of the royal house. From 2007 to 2018 she led her own alternative therapy center, commonly known in Norway as the "angel school", which provided training in clairvoyance and communication with angels and communication with the dead. She was married to the late writer and visual artist Ari Behn from 2002 to 2017. In May 2019 she publicly announced her romantic relationship and professional collaboration with Durek Verrett, a conspiracy theorist and self-described shaman who has served time in prison and who has been characterized by Norwegian media and other critics as a conman. 

As part of her withdrawal into private professional life, she lost the style "Royal Highness" in 2002; the lower style "Highness" is occasionally used informally abroad, but she does not hold a style in Norway. She has often faced criticism in Norway for her claims of being clairvoyant and for exploiting her constitutional title as princess commercially; in 2019, the royal court announced that she will no longer use the title princess in her business activities as a clairvoyant. In 2022, she relinquished her remaining royal duties to concentrate on alternative medicine.

Early life 
Princess Märtha Louise was born on 22 September 1971 at The National Hospital the Oslo University Hospital in Oslo, to the then Crown Prince Harald and Crown Princess Sonja. Princess Märtha Louise was named after her late grandmother and her paternal great-great grandmother. At birth, she was not in line to the throne, because until 1990, only males could inherit the Norwegian throne. She was baptized a few months after her birth. Her godparents are King Olav V of Norway, Princess Margaretha of Sweden, Count Flemming of Rosenborg, Princess Ragnhild of Norway, Dagny Haraldsen, Haakon Haraldsen, Nils Jørgen Astrup and Ilmi Riddervold.

In 1973, Märtha Louise's younger brother, Haakon Magnus, was born. In 1990 the Norwegian constitution was altered, granting full cognatic primogeniture to the Norwegian throne, meaning that the eldest child, regardless of sex, takes precedence in the line of succession. This change only affects those born in 1990 or later. Females born between 1971 and 1990 (i.e. only Märtha Louise), were given succession rights, but their brothers would be before them in the line of succession, meaning that Prince Haakon still took precedence over Märtha Louise in the line of succession. After the births of her brother's two children, Ingrid Alexandra and Sverre Magnus, Märtha Louise was relegated to fourth in line.

Education and career 

Princess Märtha Louise is a certified physiotherapist, following education in Oslo and internship in Maastricht, the Netherlands. She has not practised her profession, however, choosing instead, from her fascination in traditional Norwegian folk tales as well as a love of music, to establish her own commercial entertainment business based on giving public and televised performances reciting folk tales and singing with well-known Norwegian choirs. In December 2003, she took part in Oslo Gospel Choir's Christmas concert with a solo performance, included on the companion CD album.

On 1 January 2002, Princess Märtha Louise started her own business, in order to work with more freedom from her constitutional role as a princess. She began paying income tax, and the King, after consulting her, issued a royal edict which removed Princess Märtha Louise's style of Royal Highness (she is conventionally accorded the lesser style Highness abroad, although this style has no legal standing in Norway). However, she retains her place in the line of succession, and though her activities were reduced, she still carries out some public duties on behalf of the King.

After several postponements due to family births and her father's illness, during which the princess took on some representation duties, Princess Märtha Louise and her husband moved to New York City in October 2004. In 2004, her first book, a children's story about the first royal family of Norway was released – Why Kings and Queens Don't Wear Crowns. Accompanying the book is a CD version of the Princess reading her story aloud.

Princess Märtha Louise has studied physiotherapy, trained as a Rosen therapist and studied at an academy for holistic medicine. She claims she can communicate with animals and angels and started her own alternative therapy center named Astarte Education, after one of the oldest goddesses in the Middle East. Astarte Education offered a three-year course on healing, readings, and angels. The princess drew criticism in Norway after the announcement that she would start Astarte Education. The newspaper Bergens Tidende called for her to give up her royal titles. Norwegian state director of Health Lars E. Hanssen, Norwegian alternative medicine advocate Dr. Bernt Rognlien, Norwegian University of Science and Technology (NTNU), religious historian Asbjørn Dyrendal and University of Oslo theology professor Inge Lønning all expressed misgivings about the princess's plans. Swedish author Jan Guillou questioned the princess's mental health.

On 11 August 2007, Märtha Louise defended the school on NRK, the Norwegian public service television network. In the interview, she regarded her relationship with angels as "creatures of light, which gave her a feeling of a strong presence and a strong and loving support." She responded to criticism that she should leave the Church of Norway by stating she still considered herself a Christian that was thankful the Church still had room for her.

On 2 October 2007, Princess Märtha Louise became the first member of the Norwegian royal family to ever appear in a court of law as she wanted to halt sales of a book entitled Martha's Angels, which used her photo on its cover without permission. She stated that she felt "commercially exploited" by the book's use of her photo, which she regarded as misuse of her name and picture. Film critic Pål Bang-Hansen stated that Märtha Louise was a "thief and hypocrite", claiming that she had stolen translated texts from his father's books.

In 2007, the Princess was editor of the book Prinsesse Märtha Louises eventyrlige verden, Eventyr fra jordens hjerte, Rodinia containing 67 fairy tales from 50 countries. In 2009, she and her Astarte Education partner Elisabeth Samnøy published Møt din skyttsengel (Meet your guardian angel), followed by Englenes hemmeligheter. Deres natur, språk og hvordan du åpner opp for dem (The secrets of angels: Their nature, language, and how you open up for them).

Princess Märtha Louise's Fund 

Her Royal Highness Princess Märtha Louise's Fund was founded on 15 September 1972 and awards funds to projects carried out by non-governmental organizations in order to provide assistance to disabled children under the age of 16 in Norway. Princess Märtha Louise is the fund's chairperson. In 2005, the fund had assets of approximately NOK 13,285,000, and total annual allocations came to about NOK 500,000.

Controversy 
In 2014, Princess Märtha Louise faced some criticism due to her association with British clairvoyant Lisa Williams. Williams was in Oslo on 14 September 2014, and gave a seminar for Soulspring, formerly known as the Angel School, which Princess Märtha Louise co-founded. Williams is known for her claims that she can communicate with the deceased. The Soulspring website carried the following message: "We in Soulspring do not communicate with dead souls in our work. And here is where our work is separate from Lisa's. To be completely honest, we don't see the point of contacting the dead. They passed over to the other side for a reason and should be allowed to stay there." No one representing the royal family commented.

Marriage and family 
On 24 May 2002, Princess Märtha Louise married author Ari Behn (1972–2019) in Trondheim. The couple had three daughters: Maud Angelica, Leah Isadora, and Emma Tallulah – all of whom are untitled. The family lived in Islington, London and Lommedalen, Bærum. Emma Tallulah Behn is a junior member of the national equestrian team, and won a bronze medal during the Norwegian National Horse Jumping Championships in 2021.

The couple divorced in 2017. In 2016, the Royal Court had announced that Märtha Louise and Behn would have joint custody of their three daughters. Ari Behn died by suicide on Christmas Day 2019.

In May 2019, the princess announced that she was in a relationship with an American citizen, a self-styled shaman named Durek Verrett (born 17 November 1974). He has faced strong criticism in Norway and been characterized by Norwegian media and other critics as a conman. Together Märtha Louise and Verrett have organised seminars titled "The Princess and the Shaman," which also were widely criticised. Verrett claims to have been initiated spiritually by an American woman who calls herself "Princess Susana von Radić of Croatia". In June 2022, the princess announced that she and Verrett were engaged.

The newspaper iTromsø noted that Märtha Louise has faced extensive criticism for associating with a conspiracy theorist and over her "commercialization and abuse of the title 'princess'".

Bibliography 
 Underveis : et portrett av prinsesse Märtha Louise, 2001, .
 Fra hjerte til hjerte ("From Heart to Heart"), 2002 in collaboration with husband Ari Behn, is a book about their wedding, .
 Why Kings And Queens Don't Wear Crowns, 2005 in collaboration with Svein Nyhus (Illustrator), .
 Eventyr fra jordens hjerte: Rodinia, 2007 (as editor) in collaboration with Kirsti Birkeland and Kristin Lyhmann (Editors), .
 Englenes hemmeligheter: Deres natur, språk og hvordan du åpner opp for dem, 2012 in collaboration with Elisabeth Nordeng, .

Titles, styles, honours and arms

Titles and styles
 22 September 1971 - 1 February 2002: Her Royal Highness Princess Märtha Louise of Norway
 1 February 2002 - present: Her Highness Princess Märtha Louise of Norway

On 8 November 2022, Märtha Louise announced that she will no longer have royal duties within the Norwegian royal house but will retain the title of Princess of Norway.

Honours

National 
 : Knight Grand Cross with Collar of the Order of Saint Olav
 : Dame of the Royal Family Decoration of King Olav V of Norway
 : Dame of the Royal Family Decoration of King Harald V of Norway
 : Recipient of the Medal of the 100th Anniversary of the Birth of King Haakon VII
 : Recipient of the King Olav V Silver Jubilee Medal
 : Recipient of the King Olav V Commemorative Medal
 : Recipient of the Medal of the 100th Anniversary of the Birth of King Olav V
 : Recipient of the Royal House Centennial Medal
 : Recipient of the King Harald V Silver Jubilee Medal

Foreign 
 : Knight of the Order of the Elephant
 : Grand Cross of the Order of the White Rose
 : Grand Cross of the Order of the Falcon
 : Knight Grand Cordon of the Order of the Star of Jordan
 : Knight Grand Cross of the Order of the Crown
 : Knight Grand Cross of the Order of Adolphe of Nassau
 : Grand Cross of the Order of Prince Henry
 : Knight Grand Cross of the Order of Civil Merit
 : Member Grand Cross of the Royal Order of the Polar Star
 : Recipient of the 50th Birthday Medal of King Carl XVI Gustaf
 : Recipient of the 70th Birthday Medal of King Carl XVI Gustaf

Notes

References

External links 

 Official Site of the Norwegian Royal Family: Princess Märtha Louise

1971 births
Clairvoyants
Commanders Grand Cross of the Order of the Polar Star
Daughters of kings
Grand Cross of the Order of Civil Merit
Grand Crosses of the Order of Prince Henry
Grand Crosses of the Order of the Crown (Netherlands)
Grand Crosses of the Order of the House of Orange
House of Glücksburg (Norway)
Knights Grand Cross of the Order of the Falcon
Living people
Norwegian Christians
Norwegian people of Danish descent
Norwegian people of English descent
Norwegian people of French descent
Norwegian people of German descent
Norwegian people of Swedish descent
Norwegian princesses
Order of Civil Merit members
Recipients of the Order of Prince Henry
Recipients of the Order of the Crown (Netherlands)
Recipients of the Order of the Falcon
Recipients of the Order of the House of Orange
United Nations High Commissioner for Refugees Goodwill Ambassadors